Stanley Behrend (15 November 1908 – 30 May 1944) was an English cricketer. He played first-class cricket for Bengal and Europeans. He was killed in action during World War II.

See also
 List of Bengal cricketers
 List of cricketers who were killed during military service

References

External links
 

1908 births
1944 deaths
Indian cricketers
Bengal cricketers
Europeans cricketers
Cricketers from Kolkata
Indian Army personnel killed in World War II